The 2012–13 Toto Cup Leumit is the 23rd season of the second tier League Cup (as a separate competition) since its introduction. It will be held in two stages. First, sixteen Liga Leumit teams are divided into four groups. The winners and runners-up advancing to the quarter-finals. Quarter-finals, semi-finals and the Final are to be held as one-legged matches, with the Final played at the Ramat Gan Stadium.

It began on 10 August 2012 and ended on 4 December 2012. Hapoel Ramat Gan, making it their second Toto Cup title overall, due to the promotion in the previous season the club could not defend their title.

It won on 4 December 2012 by Hapoel Rishon LeZion.

Group stage
The draw took place on 2 July 2012.

The matches were played from 10 August to 8 September 2012.

Group A

Group B

Group C

Group D

Elimination rounds

Quarterfinals
The matches were played on 12 and 13 October 2012.

1 Score after 90 minutes

Semifinals
The matches were played on 20 November 2012.

1 Score after 90 minutes

Final

See also
 2012–13 Toto Cup Al
 2012–13 Liga Leumit
 2012–13 Israel State Cup

References

External links
 Official website 

Leumit
Toto Cup Leumit
Toto Cup Leumit